Ahmed Abdullahi (born 19 June 2004) is a Nigerian professional footballer who plays as a forward for Jong Gent.

Club career
In 2021, Abdullahi went on trial with French side Olympique de Marseille and German side Borussia Dortmund, with Belgian side Gent also showing interest. He went on to sign for the latter, despite interest from a number of other clubs across Europe.

International career
Abdullahi was called up to the Nigerian under-20 side for the 2023 Africa U-20 Cup of Nations. He had to forego his salary for a month at club side Gent to play in the tournament, as the Belgian club did not view the under-20 competition as important enough to miss training sessions for. He received a red card in the first game against Senegal; a second yellow for dangerous play.

Career statistics

Club

Notes

References

2004 births
Living people
People from Nasarawa State
Nigerian footballers
Nigeria youth international footballers
Association football forwards
Belgian National Division 1 players
K.A.A. Gent players
Nigerian expatriate footballers
Nigerian expatriate sportspeople in Belgium
Expatriate footballers in Belgium